The Androids are an Australian rock band. Fronted by guitarist Tim Henwood (originally from The Superjesus) with members Sam Grayson, Matt Tomlinson and Marty Grech. While their 2002 single, "Do It with Madonna", was commercially their most successful release - peaking at #4 in the Australia ARIA Singles Chart and #15 in the UK Singles Chart; their second and third singles, "Here She Comes" and "Brand New Life" could not replicate "Do It with Madonna"'s success. Their self-titled album debuted and peaked at #36 on the ARIA Albums Chart.

Though not a huge success internationally, they are remembered for the music video for "Do It with Madonna", which featured drag queens dressed as Britney Spears, Christina Aguilera, Pink, Kylie Minogue and Madonna, the song's namesake.

At the ARIA Music Awards of 2003, The Androids won ARIA Award for Best Video for "Do It with Madonna".

The band supported Pink on the Australian leg of her I'm Not Dead Tour in 2007 and the released their second album, Outta Ya Mind.

Discography

Albums

Singles

Awards and nominations

ARIA Music Awards
The ARIA Music Awards are a set of annual ceremonies presented by Australian Recording Industry Association (ARIA), which recognise excellence, innovation, and achievement across all genres of the music of Australia. They commenced in 1987. 

! 
|-
| rowspan="3"| 2003 || rowspan="2"|  "Do It with Madonna" || ARIA Award for Highest Selling Single ||  || rowspan="3"| 
|-
| ARIA Award for Best Pop Release ||  
|-
| Bart Borghesi – The Androids – "Do It with Madonna" || ARIA Award for Best Video ||

References

ARIA Award winners
Australian rock music groups